Lautaro Germán Acosta (born 14 March 1988) is an Argentine professional footballer who plays for Club Atlético Lanús as a winger.

He started his professional career at Lanús, making his debut with the first team at 18. He also spent some time in the Spanish La Liga, signing with Sevilla in 2008.

Club career

Lanús
Born in Glew, Buenos Aires, Almirante Brown Partido, Acosta came through the youth system at Club Atlético Lanús, making his senior debut at the age of 18. As the club was often forced to sell its best players, he quickly became an important part of the first team.

Acosta was part of the Lanús squad that won the 2007 Apertura tournament, their first ever Primera División title. In May 2007, he suffered a serious cheekbone injury, and had to wear a specially-fitted face mask for two months.

Sevilla
On 29 May 2008, aged 20, Acosta signed for La Liga team Sevilla FC on a five-year contract, for a reported fee of €7 million subject to a medical. Shortly after his arrival in Andalusia, he suffered a serious injury and never fully recovered, his best output consisting of ten league games in 2010–11 (267 minutes, only two starts).

On 4 February 2009, Acosta scored his first – and only – goal for Sevilla, in the first leg of the Copa del Rey semi-finals, a 2–1 home win against Athletic Bilbao but an eventual 2–4 aggregate loss. In July 2011 he was loaned to fellow league side Racing de Santander, joining compatriots Ariel Nahuelpan and Héctor Cúper (manager); he started and netted on his official debut for the Cantabrians, but in a 4–3 away defeat to Valencia CF.

Return home
Acosta returned to his country in 2012, going on to represent Boca Juniors and former club Lanús. He was a key attacking element in five of the six titles won after his return, including the 2016 national championship. In October 2014, whilst at the service of the latter, he was kidnapped, threatened at gunpoint, assaulted and robbed after being led to his home.

International career
In 2007, Acosta was picked to join the Argentina under-20 squad to compete in the 2007 South American U-20 Championship in Paraguay. He headed the only goal in the last game against Uruguay, to secure the national team's qualification for both the 2007 FIFA U-20 World Cup and the 2008 Summer Olympics.

After appearing in six out of seven games in the under-20s triumph in Canada, Acosta scored against Ivory Coast in a 2–1 group stage win in the Beijing Olympic tournament, en route to another international conquest. He was selected by the full side for a Copa América Centenario provisional squad, but did not make the final cut.

Acosta received his first senior call-up by coach Jorge Sampaoli on 27 August 2017, for 2018 FIFA World Cup qualifiers against Uruguay and Venezuela. He earned his first cap against the former four days later, coming on as a substitute for Marcos Acuña at the hour-mark of an eventual 0–0 away draw.

Career statistics

Club

Honours
Lanús
Argentine Primera División: 2007 Apertura, 2016
Copa Sudamericana: 2013
Supercopa Argentina: 2016
Copa Bicentenario: 2016

Argentina
FIFA U-20 World Cup: 2007
Summer Olympic Games: 2008

References

External links

1988 births
Living people
People from Almirante Brown Partido
Sportspeople from Buenos Aires Province
Argentine footballers
Association football wingers
Argentine Primera División players
Club Atlético Lanús footballers
Boca Juniors footballers
La Liga players
Sevilla FC players
Racing de Santander players
Argentina under-20 international footballers
Argentina international footballers
Olympic footballers of Argentina
Footballers at the 2008 Summer Olympics
Olympic medalists in football
Medalists at the 2008 Summer Olympics
Olympic gold medalists for Argentina
Argentine expatriate footballers
Expatriate footballers in Spain
Argentine expatriate sportspeople in Spain